Douglas Charles Youvan (born January 29, 1955) is an American scientist.

Biography
Youvan received an associate degree in Electronics and a bachelor's degree in Biology from Pittsburg State University. He received his Ph.D. degree in biophysics from UC Berkeley.

Youvan was an Associate Professor of Chemistry at MIT, where he specialized in the study of photosynthesis, specifically the spectral analysis of photosynthetic bacteria. Youvan, along with Mary M. Yang, developed instrumentation to study the spectra of bacteria directly from a petri dish. Their technology was later employed by NASA.

He founded Karios Scientific Inc. together with Mary M. Yang.  Due to a docketing error, Kairos lost its patent rights to KCAT, an instrument used for screening enzyme kinetics on microcolonies.  Kairos' lawsuit against Fish and Richardson ends with California Supreme Court case S141615, with a remand and instructions resulting in a $34.5 million award to Kairos.  The Wayback Machine indicates the extensive Kairos website has been thoroughly archived and that it operated from 1996 to 2013.  , Kairos' online journal, Biotechnology et alia, is still operational and carries several of Youvan's publications.

Youvan's work on proteins that interact with light is referenced in two Nobel Prize Lectures: by Roger Y. Tsien on GFP and by Diesenhofer and Michel for photosynthetic reaction centers.  According to Google Scholar, Youvan is referenced in 5900 other publications.

Research focus
In his 1981 Ph.D. thesis, Youvan found inhibitors (hypermodified nucleosides) of retroviral reverse transcriptase present in ribosomal RNA.

In a 1984 publication with John E. Hearst, and in collaboration with Barry L. Marrs, Youvan published the nucleotide and deduced protein sequence for the photosynthetic reaction center – the proteins that convert light to chemical energy in photosynthetic organisms. This work correctly predicted the secondary structure of the 11 transmembrane helices of the reaction center as confirmed by X-ray crystallography. In 1987 Youvan and E. Bylina constructed the first site-directed mutants of bacterial reaction centers. Later collaborative work with ultra-fast laser laboratories helped yield evidence for a vibrational coherence in the sub-picosecond processes of photosynthetic charge separation. International collaborative work was funded by a Human Frontier Science Program Award.

Youvan and his students have also worked in the field of combinatorial mutagenesis which can be used for directed evolution of proteins, such as enzymes. At MIT, they discovered a pattern in the genetic code regarding the residue hydropathy and molar volume of encoded amino acids.

Youvan has also published research in the fields of digital imaging spectroscopy for absorption spectra and fluorescence, including Fluorescence Resonance Energy Transfer (FRET). Zeiss has incorporated "Youvan's Method" into their Axiomat microscope for algorithmic deconvolution of the actual FRET signal in an image (such as GFP interactions) from interfering donor and acceptor spectral signals.

References

External links
 Personal website 1, with a self-published, ongoing e-book, Pseudocolor in Pure and Applied Mathematics
 Personal website 2, with a self-published e-book, Questions of a Christian Biophysicist

1955 births
Living people
American biophysicists
UC Berkeley College of Letters and Science alumni
Massachusetts Institute of Technology School of Science faculty
Scientists from Kansas
People from Frontenac, Kansas